Frösön ("Frey's island"), (Old ) is the largest island in the lake Storsjön, located west of the city Östersund in Jämtland, Sweden. During most of recorded history Frösön was the regional centre of Jämtland, and it is the location of the Frösö Runestone, the northernmost in the world.

The Swedish composer Wilhelm Peterson-Berger had a summer house (and from 1930 a permanent home) on the island. In 1896 Peterson-Berger composed a set of piano pieces entitled Frösöblomster (Flowers of Frösön), and his opera Arnljot from 1910 is partly based on the runic inscriptions on Frösö Runestone.

History
Frösön is named after the Norse god Freyr. It is the location of the "Frösö Runestone", the northernmost raised runestone in the world, dating from 1030-1050 AD. Frösön was a separate köping until 1974 but was merged with Östersund at that time.

Hospital
The hospital's practices have later been questioned, and it is known to have anonymously buried at least roughly 50 of its patients.

Climate

Gallery

References

External links

Jämtland
Islands of Jämtland County
Former Norwegian populated places
Lake islands of Sweden